Karl Sax (November 2, 1892 – October 8, 1973) was an American botanist and geneticist, noted for his research in cytogenetics and the effect of radiation on chromosomes.

Early life and education
Sax was born in Spokane, Washington in 1892. His parents were pioneer farmers and active in civic affairs; his father was the mayor of Colville, Washington. Sax's early education was in the Colville schools, and in 1912 he continued his studies at Washington State College. He majored in agriculture, and his subsequent decision to undertake graduate work was influenced by the botanist and plant breeder Edward Gaines.

In college, he met and married Hally Jolivette, his cytology teacher, and they later had three sons. Following his graduation, Hally accepted a position at Wellesley College in Wellesley, Massachusetts, and they moved to the East Coast in 1916. Sax enrolled in the doctoral program at the Bussey Institution Graduate School of Applied Biology at Harvard University in Cambridge, Massachusetts and completed his MA in 1917.

He went on to do his doctoral work at Harvard University, receiving his D.Sc. in 1922.

He served as a private in the US Army from 1917 to 1918 in World War I.

Scientific career
In 1918, Sax took a job as an instructor in the Department of Genetics at the University of California, Berkeley, where he worked with E. B. Babcock on the genetics of the genus Crepis. In 1920 he took an appointment at the Riverbank Laboratories in Geneva, Illinois working on wheat genetics, but he moved on from that job soon after when he took a position at the Maine Agricultural Experiment Station in Orono, Maine.

In 1928 he left Orono to take a teaching position in Harvard's genetics department at the Bussey Institution. However, the department was dissolved before his arrival, and he transferred to the cytology department at the University's Biological Laboratories in Cambridge, Massachusetts.

Contribution to radiation cytology

In 1938 Sax published a paper entitled "Chromosome Aberrations Induced by X-rays," which demonstrated that radiation could induce major genetic changes by affecting chromosomal translocations, a chromosome abnormality. The paper is thought to mark the beginning of the field of radiation cytology, and led him to be called the "father of radiation cytology."

Plant breeding
Sax bred new varieties of ornamental trees and shrubs including Malus species (both apples and crabapples), magnolias, forsythias, and cherries. He hybridized two Japanese cherries,  Prunus subhirtella and Prunus x yedoensis, then back-crossed the resulting hybrid with P. subhirtella, and named his cross Prunus x 'Hally Jolivette' in honor of his wife. A cultivar of Forsythia bred by Sax was named 'Karl Sax' by a nurseryman. In 1946 he was appointed acting director of Harvard's Arnold Arboretum, in 1947 becoming the director – a post he held until 1954.

Demography
Sax was also interested in human demography. In 1955 he wrote Standing Room Only: The Challenge to Overpopulation, on the consequences of uncontrolled human population growth. Sax became associated with Planned Parenthood and was a member of the Population Association of America.

Honors
Sax was an elected member of the National Academy of Sciences and the American Academy of Arts and Sciences. In 1966, he and Hally were co-recipients of the Mary Soper Pope Memorial Award in botany.

In 1959 he retired and moved to Media, Pennsylvania where he continued his work on plant breeding.
Karl Sax died on October 8, 1973.

References

"Dr. Karl Sax Dies; Botanist Was 81". New York Times, Oct. 10, 1973.
Smocovitis, V. B. Sax, Karl. 'American National Biography Online. Oxford University Press
Swanson, C. P. 1988. Cytogenetics and Karl Sax. Genetics'' 119:5–7

External links
Biographical Memoir of Karl Sax written by Carl P. Swanson and Norman H. Giles for the U.S. National Academy of Sciences, a superb source of information about Sax and his work

1892 births
1973 deaths
People from Spokane, Washington
American botanists
Arnold Arboretum
American geneticists
Washington State University alumni
Bussey Institution alumni
University of California, Berkeley faculty
Members of the United States National Academy of Sciences
United States Army soldiers
United States Army personnel of World War I
People from Colville, Washington